Sir Victor Joseph Patrick Glover (5 November 1932 – 2 February 2020) was a Mauritian lawyer, judge and Chief Justice who played an active role in legal and judicial matters on the island of Mauritius.

Early life, education and family

Glover was born in Mauritius in 1932, the son of Mary Catherine Reddy-Glover and Harold Joseph George Glover, the latter being a Supreme Court judge who became Electoral Commissioner for two decades. Harold Glover was also Labour Party candidate at the 1936 General Elections.

He studied law (Jurisprudence) at Jesus College, Oxford University after being awarded a scholarship (laureate) at the end of his secondary education at Collège du Saint-Esprit in Mauritius.

Glover was married to Ginette. Their sons Brian and Gavin are both barristers.

He died at the age of 87 on 2 February 2020.

Career

In 1957 Glover was called to the Bar in England and Wales. He returned to his homeland Mauritius where he practised law as a barrister. Then in 1962 he started working at the Attorney General's office and eventually was promoted to the position of Parliamentary Counsel. At the age of 44 in 1976 and following his father's footsteps he became Supreme Court judge. In 1982 he became Senior Puisne Judge. Eventually in 1988 in addition to be named Queen's Counsel (QC), Victor Glover was also promoted to the position of Chief Justice in succession to Sir Cassam Moollan who had retired. After 6 years as Glover eventually retired from public service in 1994 and Rajsoomer Lallah succeeded him as Chief Justice.

Starting from 1994 Glover worked as a legal adviser in a private legal firm in Mauritius. He was also a consultant for the Attorney General, drafting and reviewing legislative dossiers.

In 1987 Glover made history in Mauritius by becoming the judge to issue the last death sentence to a guilty party before the death penalty was abolished. Indeed Glover sentenced 33-year old Eshan Nayeck to death for the premeditated murder of Rashid Atchia on 23 July 1983 in Port Louis. However Glover was subsequently against the re-introduction of the death penalty in Mauritius.

Recognition
In 1989 Glover was made a Knight of the British Empire.

Glover was made an Honorary Professor of Law at the University of Mauritius.

He was made a Grand Officer of the Order of the Star and Key of the Indian Ocean (GOSK) in 1992.

References

2020 deaths
1932 births
Mauritian people of English descent
Alumni of Jesus College, Oxford
20th-century Mauritian judges
Grand Officers of the Order of the Star and Key of the Indian Ocean
Chief justices of Mauritius
Members of the Middle Temple
Mauritian Knights Bachelor